Stenalia flavipennis is a beetle in the genus Stenalia of the family Mordellidae. It was described in 1953 by Ermisch.

References

flavipennis
Beetles described in 1953